Sang Bijar (also Romanized as Sang Bījār; also known as Sangabadzhar, Sangabajar, and Sang Bejār) is a village in Rud Pish Rural District, in the Central District of Fuman County, Gilan Province, Iran. At the 2006 census, its population was 805, in 212 families.

References 

Populated places in Fuman County